Dehnel is a surname. Notable people with this surname include:

August Dehnel (1903–1962), Polish biologist
Jacek Dehnel (born 1980), Polish poet, writer, translator and painter
 (1880–1936), Polish physician, independence fighter, statesman 
 (1911–1984), Polish military officer